Escuela Internacional Sampedrana, EIS is a private coeducational K-12 school located in the Lomas del Potosí neighborhood of San Pedro Sula, Cortés Department, Honduras.

The school is accredited by the Southern Association of Colleges and Schools (SACS).

EIS is a member of ABSH (Association of Bilingual Schools of Honduras) and AASCA (Association of American Schools in Central America). EIS has 27 AASCA championships, between soccer, basketball, volleyball and track and field (T-third most).

Faculty
The faculty for EIS is composed of 40% Honduran teachers, 25% Canadian and 35% US teachers. All other staff that is not related to teaching is 95% Honduran and 5% International. All teachers at EIS have at minimum a bachelor's degree or equivalent.

Facilities
Separate buildings house the preschool, elementary, middle school, and high school students. The administration offices, main library, auditorium, and gymnasium are in separate buildings. Athletic facilities include a lower school playground, indoor and outdoor courts for basketball and volleyball, and playing fields for soccer and softball. The school recently inaugurated new locker rooms next to the soccer fields.

The school has 61 classrooms, as well as science and computer laboratories, music rooms, a media center, and a separate preschool building. The elementary complex was renovated during the summer of 1997. The middle school was renovated during the summer of 2004. The preschool building was renovated during the summer of 2002.

The school has a vast library with content for elementary and middle/high school. A small collection exists for the preschool.  Students can find material in English and Spanish.

Extracurricular activities
Extracurricular activities include:
National Honor Society
Student Council
Yearbook
Knowledge Bowl
Model United Nations
SPSMUN, the annual conference held by the EIS MUN club, was started by alumni Shady Zummar and Christopher Harris under the supervision of Nicolas Harris, the club's advisor at the time. 
MOAS
Band
Drama
Chess
HACIA Democracy
Global Issues Network
Math Club
Charity Club

Sports
Soccer
Basketball
Volleyball
Track and Field
Cross Country
Cheerleading

References

External links

Official website

International schools in Honduras
Bilingual schools
Educational institutions established in 1953
Schools in San Pedro Sula
1953 establishments in Honduras